Anita Csíkné Tóth (born November 12, 1979) is a Hungarian sport shooter. Toth represented Hungary at the 2008 Summer Olympics in Beijing, where she competed for two rifle shooting events. She placed thirty-fifth out of forty-seven shooters in the women's 10 m air rifle, with a total score of 390 points. Nearly a week later, Toth competed for her second event, 50 m rifle 3 positions, where she was able to shoot 194 targets in a prone position, 187 in standing, and 188 in kneeling, for a total score of 569 points, finishing only in thirty-seventh place.

References

External links
NBC Olympics Profile

Hungarian female sport shooters
Living people
Olympic shooters of Hungary
Shooters at the 2008 Summer Olympics
People from Szolnok
1979 births
Sportspeople from Jász-Nagykun-Szolnok County
21st-century Hungarian women